Vimba is a genus of cyprinid fish that is found in Europe and western Asia. There are currently four described species.

Species 
 Vimba elongata (Valenciennes, 1844) (Bavarian vimba)
 Vimba melanops (Heckel, 1837) (Macedonian vimba)
 Vimba mirabilis (Ladiges, 1960) (Menderes vimba)
 Vimba vimba (Linnaeus, 1758) (Vimba bream)

References 
 

 
Taxonomy articles created by Polbot